Augusto Aurelio Fábrega Donado (born September 10, 1940) is a retired Panamanian diplomat who formerly served as Panamanian Ambassador to Russia from 2005 to 2009.

Biography 
Augusto Aurelio Fábrega Donado was born on September 10, 1940 in Aguadulce, Panama. After working as an elementary school teacher, he went to the Soviet Union to study, and graduated from the Peoples' Friendship University of Russia.

In 2006, he was chosen to serve as Panamanian Ambassador to Russia. He presented his credentials to Russian President Vladimir Putin on 3 February 2006.

See also
Panama–Russia relations

References

Living people
Ambassadors of Panama to Russia
Panamanian diplomats
Peoples' Friendship University of Russia alumni
1940 births